Arxan (or A'ershan) Yi'ershi Airport  is an airport serving the city of Arxan (A'ershan) in the Hinggan League of Inner Mongolia Autonomous Region, China.  It is located near the town of Yi'ershi, 16.5 kilometers north of the city center.  Construction started in September 2008 with a total investment of 303 million yuan, and the airport was opened on 28 August 2011.

Facilities
The airport has one runway that is 2,400 meters long and 45 meters wide, and is designed to handle 290,000 passengers per year.

Airlines and destinations

See also
List of airports in China
List of the busiest airports in China

References

Airports in Inner Mongolia
2011 establishments in China
Airports established in 2011